"The Best Man I Can Be" is a 1999 song for the film The Best Man. It features four R&B singers: Ginuwine, RL of Next, Tyrese and Case.

Credits and personnel
Credits lifted from the liner notes of The Best Man.

 James Harris III – producer, writer
 Terry Lewis – producer, writer
 Steve Rodge – mixing engineer
 Big Jim Wright – additional background vocals, co-producer, writer
 Xavier – mixing assistant

Charts

Weekly charts

Year-end charts

References

1999 singles
Ginuwine songs
Case (singer) songs
Songs written by Jimmy Jam and Terry Lewis
Song recordings produced by Jimmy Jam and Terry Lewis
1999 songs
Columbia Records singles
1990s ballads
Contemporary R&B ballads